Koukaki ( or) is a southeast neighbourhood of the Municipality of Athens, Greece.

Location
The general area of Koukaki borders from the north with Makrygianni neighbourhood and the historical district of Plaka (the historical neighbourhood of Athens), the Municipality of Kallithea and Petralona neighbourhood from the south, Neos Kosmos neighbourhood from the east, and Filopappou and Thisio neighbourhoods from the west. The two largest streets that cross Koukaki are Veikou Street (north-to-south) and Dimitrakopoulou Street (south-to-north). On the borderline between Koukaki and Neos Kosmos stands Andrea Syngrou Avenue, an important avenue in Athens that connects its center with Poseidonos Avenue to the south.

Amenities
It has a large weekly vegetable market every Friday.

Transportation
The nearest overground station is Petralona.

Koukaki is served by both lines (Syntagma-SEF and Syntagma-Kolimvitirio) of the Athens Tram (L. Vouliagmenis and Fix stops).

Koukaki is served  by a large number of bus routes along Andrea Syngrou Avenue, including 024, 040, 106, 110, 126, 134, 135, 136, 137, 230, A2, B2, E2, and E22. In terms of trolley bus, Routes 1, 5, and 15 have stops along Veikou and Dimitrakopoulou streets.

Points of interest
 The Agios Ioannis (St. John's Church)
 The old Fix brewery ruins on Andrea Syngrou Avenue
 The cafe and restaurant-filled Drakou pedestrian zone from Gargaretta Square
 The cafe and restaurant-filled G. Olympiou pedestrian zone from Koukaki Square
 The 14th and 33rd high-schools of Athens

Famous current and former residents
Koula Agagiotou (1915–2006), Greek actress
Nikolaos Kaklamanakis (1968- ), Greek Olympic gold medalist
Sapfo Notara (1907–1985), Greek actress
Ekaterini Thanou (1975– ), Greek athlete
Mikis Theodorakis (1925-2021), composer
Viky Vanita (1948?–2007), Greek actress
Dimosthenis Voutyras (1871?–1958), Greek writer

External links
Informative text in English, attractions, and photos
Rob Wallace's photographs from Koukaki
P.A.O. Koukaki Volleyball Club website

Neighbourhoods in Athens